Peter Taiye Oladotun (born 6 December 1985, in Lagos) is a Nigerian professional football striker playing with Lija Athletic F.C. in the Maltese First Division.

He had previously played with Serbian clubs FK Radnički Jugopetrol (Belgrade), FK Bežanija, FK PKB Padinska Skela and FK Radnički 1923 (Kragujevac), known that season as Šumadija Radnički 1923, also in Montenegro, with FK Rudar Pljevlja and FK Mladost Podgorica, and Croatia, with NK Orijent (Rijeka), before moving to Bosnia and Herzegovina and signing with FK Sutjeska Foča in summer 2010 to play in the First League of Republika Srpska. In summer 2011 he moved to Albania to play with KS Kamza in the Albanian Superliga but after only 6 months he moved to Malta by signing with Marsaxlokk F.C. in the Maltese Premier League.  In January 2013 he joined Lija Athletic F.C. playing in the Maltese First Division.

References

External sources
 Profile and photo at FK Radnički 1923 official site
 Peter Taiye Oladotun at Srbijafudbal
 2010-11 stats at BiHsoccer

Living people
1985 births
Sportspeople from Lagos
Nigerian footballers
Association football forwards
FK Radnički Beograd players
FK Rudar Pljevlja players
OFK Titograd players
FK Bežanija players
FK Radnički 1923 players
HNK Orijent players
FC Kamza players
Marsaxlokk F.C. players
Lija Athletic F.C. players
Yoruba sportspeople
Nigerian expatriate footballers
Expatriate footballers in Montenegro
Expatriate footballers in Serbia
Expatriate footballers in Croatia
Expatriate footballers in Bosnia and Herzegovina
Expatriate footballers in Albania
Expatriate footballers in Malta
Nigerian expatriate sportspeople in Montenegro
Nigerian expatriate sportspeople in Serbia
Nigerian expatriate sportspeople in Croatia
Nigerian expatriate sportspeople in Bosnia and Herzegovina
Nigerian expatriate sportspeople in Albania
Nigerian expatriate sportspeople in Malta